Angel Award may refer to:

Anděl Awards (Angel Award for Czech music)
Angel Award (Monaco International Film Festival)
Angel Award (Excellence in Media)
 Angel Award (International Angel Investors), by the International Angel Investors organization for venture-capital activities
 Golden Angel Award of the Tofifest held annually in Toruń, Poland